The following is a list of notable events and releases of the year 2017 in Norwegian music.

Events

January
 12 – The 16th All Ears festival started in Oslo (January 12–15).
 20 – The 36th annual Djangofestival started at Cosmopolite in Oslo (January 20–21).
 21 – Hot Club de Norvège headline at the annual Djangofestival at Cosmopolite in Oslo, Norway.
 28 – Presentation of the Spellemannprisen awards.

February 
 1 – The 6th Bodø Jazz Open started in Bodø, Norway (February 1–4).
 2 – The 19th Polarjazz Festival started in Longyearbyen, Svalbard  (February 2–5).
 4 – The Oslo Operaball was arranged in Oslo (February 4–5).
 9 – The 12th Ice Music Festival started in Geilo, Norway (February 9–11).

March 
 2 – The By:Larm Festival started in Oslo (March 2–4).
 11 –  Selection of the contributor of Norway in the Eurovision Song Contest 2017.
 17 – The 60th Narvik Winter Festival started in Narvik (March 17–26).
 29 – The Fartein Valen Festival started in Haugesund (March 29 – April 2).

April 
 7 – The 44th Vossajazz started in Voss, Norway (April 7–9).
 12 – Inferno Metal Festival 2017 started in Oslo (April 12–15).
 15 – The Sámi Grand Prix took place at Báktehárji in Kautokeino.

May 
 5 – The Balejazz started in Balestrand (May 5–7).
 9 – The 28th MaiJazz started in Stavanger (May 9–14).
 10 – The 13th AnJazz, the Hamar Jazz Festival started at Hamar, Norway (May 10–14).
 24 – The Festspillene i Bergen started in Bergen, Norway (May 24 – June 7).
 26
 The 45th Nattjazz started in Bergen, Norway (May 26 – June 4)
 Fabio Biondi announces the termination of his commitment as early music programme director for Stavanger Symphony Orchestra (2006–2017).

June
 3 – The National Music Day was arranged in Oslo.
 14 – The Bergenfest started in Bergen, Norway (June 14–17).
 17 – The Norwegian Wood music festival started in Oslo, Norway.

July
 5 – The Kongsberg Jazzfestival opened at Kongsberg consert (August 5–8).
 6
 The 17th Stavernfestivalen started in Stavern, Norway (July 6 – 8).
 The 21st Skånevik Bluesfestival started in Skånevik, Norway (July 6 – 8).
 12 – The Slottsfjell Festival started in Tønsberg (July 12–15).
 17 – The Moldejazz started in Molde (August 17–22).
 20 – The Bukta Festival started in Telegrafbukta, Tromsø (August 20–22).
 25 – Singer-songwriter Susanne Sundfør starred in a Prom concert at London's Royal Albert Hall, performing songs by Scott Walker.
 26 – The Canal Street Festival started in Arendal (July 26–29).
 27 – The Márkomeannu Festival started in Skånland (July 27–29).

August
 3 – The Notodden Blues Festival started in Notodden (August 3–6).
 8 – The 19th Øyafestivalen started in Oslo ( August 8–13).
 9 – The Kalottspel started in Målselv (August 9–13).
 10
 The Rosendal Kammermusikkfestival started in Rosendal (August 10–13).
 The Tromsø Jazz Festival started in Tromsø (August 10 – 13).
 12 – The 32nd Oslo Jazzfestival started in Oslo (August 12–19).
 18 – The Parkenfestivalen started in Bodø (August 18–19).
 30 – The Blues in Hell started in Stjørdal (August 30 – September 3).
 31 – The 12th Punktfestivalen started in Kristiansand (August 31 – September 2).

September 
 1 – The Granittrock Festival started in Grorud (September 1–2).

October 
 19 – The 34th DølaJazz started in Lillehammer (October 19–22).
 27 – The Osafestivalen started in Voss (October 27–29).
 31 – The Oslo World Music Festival started in Oslo (October 31 – November 5).

November 
 8 – The Vardø Blues Festival (Blues i Vintermørket) started (November 8–12).

December 
 11 – The Nobel Peace Prize Concert was held at Telenor Arena.

Albums released

January

February

March

April

May

June

July

August

September

October

November

December

New Artists 
 Sigrid, singer and recipient of the newcomer Spellemannprisen.

Deaths 

 January
 18 – Ståle Wikshåland, musicologist (born 1953).

 February
 22 – Dag Østerberg, sociologist and musicologist (born 1938)

 April
 9 – Knut Borge, journalist, entertainer, and jazz enthusiast (born 1949).
 10 – Øyvind Klingberg, pianist and showman, Dizzie Tunes (born 1943).
 18 – Arild Engh, drummer, Ole Ivars (born 1946).

 June
 7 – Jan Høiland, singer and entertainer (born 1939

 July
 7 – Egil Monn-Iversen, composer and pianist (born 1928).
 13 – Egil Kapstad, jazz pianist and composer (born 1940).

 October
 7 – Jan Arvid Johansen, folk singer and musician (born 1943).
 22 – Atle Hammer, jazz trumpeter (born 1932).

 December
 21 – Halvard Kausland, jazz guitarist (born 1945).

See also
 2017 in Norway
 Music of Norway
 Norway in the Eurovision Song Contest 2017
 Spellemannprisen
 Buddyprisen
 Nordlysprisen
 Edvard Grieg Memorial Award
 Thorgeir Stubø Memorial Award
 Rolf Gammleng Memorial Award
 Radka Toneff Memorial Award

References

 
Norwegian music
Norwegian
Music
2010s in Norwegian music